Carl-Håkan Bergman (born 1954) is a Swedish politician and former member of the Riksdag, the national legislature. A member of the Social Democratic Party, he represented Örebro County between October 2010 and September 2018.

References

1954 births
Living people
Members of the Riksdag 2010–2014
Members of the Riksdag 2014–2018
Members of the Riksdag from the Social Democrats